Cynolebias  is a genus of freshwater annual killifish in the family Rivulidae. They are endemic to northeastern Brazil, generally in temporary waters such as ponds in the Caatinga and adjacent regions. By far the highest species richness is in the São Francisco River basin, but there are also species east and north of this system, and west as far as the Tocantins River basin. Many species have rather small distributions and some are highly threatened.

Species
The currently recognized species in this genus are:

 Cynolebias albipunctatus W. J. E. M. Costa & G. C. Brasil, 1991
 Cynolebias altus W. J. E. M. Costa, 2001
 Cynolebias attenuatus W. J. E. M. Costa, 2001
 Cynolebias gibbus W. J. E. M. Costa, 2001
 Cynolebias gilbertoi W. J. E. M. Costa, 1998
 Cynolebias griseus W. J. E. M. Costa, Lacerda & G. C. Brasil, 1990
 Cynolebias itapicuruensis W. J. E. M. Costa, 2001
 Cynolebias leptocephalus W. J. E. M. Costa & G. C. Brasil, 1993
 Cynolebias microphthalmus W. J. E. M. Costa & G. C. Brasil, 1995
 Cynolebias obscurus W. J. E. M. Costa, 2014
 Cynolebias ochraceus W. J. E. M. Costa, 2014
 Cynolebias oticus W. J. E. M. Costa, 2014
 Cynolebias paraguassuensis W. J. E. M. Costa, Suzart & D. T. B. Nielsen, 2007
 Cynolebias parietalis W. J. E. M. Costa, 2014
 Cynolebias parnaibensis W. J. E. M. Costa, T. P. A. Ramos, Alexandre & R. T. C. Ramos, 2010
 Cynolebias perforatus W. J. E. M. Costa & G. C. Brasil, 1991
 Cynolebias porosus Steindachner, 1876
 Cynolebias rectiventer W. J. E. M. Costa, 2014
 Cynolebias roseus W. J. E. M. Costa, 2014
 Cynolebias vazabarrisensis W. J. E. M. Costa, 2001

References 

 
Rivulidae
Freshwater fish genera
Taxa named by Franz Steindachner
Taxonomy articles created by Polbot